Athol George Guy  (born 5 January 1940) is a member of the Australian pop music group the Seekers, for whom he plays double bass and sings. He is easily recognisable by his black-framed "Buddy Holly" style glasses, and, during live performances, often acts as the group's compère.

Early life
Athol George Guy was born on 5 January 1940 in Colac, Victoria, the son of George Francis Guy (RAN) and Doris Thelma (née Cole) Guy. Guy was educated at Gardenvale Central School, where he was school captain.  He entered Melbourne High School, where he was twice under age athletic champion and an officer in the cadet corps. During this time he was Victorian Sub Junior High Jump Champion and then silver medallist to Olympian Colin Ridgway the next year.

Music career

Guy formed his first musical group in 1958, the Ramblers, resulting in his move into performance, marketing and production at GTV9. Progressing via HSV7, media manager with the Clemenger Group and account exec with J. Walter Thompson, he then set sail with the Seekers for 10 weeks' holiday abroad. On his return he established his own consulting company and compèred two national TV shows.

When the Seekers disbanded in 1968, Guy hosted his own variety series — A Guy Called Athol — on Australia's Seven Network, and later the quiz show Big Nine on the Nine Network. In 1971, he was elected as the Liberal member for Gisborne in the Victorian Legislative Assembly. One of its youngest members, he won three terms with an increasing majority before he returned to the commercial world as a corporate consultant. Guy has taken part in subsequent reunions of the Seekers since 1993, when they celebrated the silver jubilee of their 1968 break up.

Politics
Guy was elected to the Victorian Legislative Assembly in a by-election on 11 December 1971 for Gisborne as a member of the Liberal Party. He served as a member of the assembly until resigning due to ill health on 5 March 1979. His achievements included the government's purchase and development of Werribee Park.

Business career

Guy opted to return to the business world and rejoined the Clemenger group as general manager of Clemenger Harvie from 1979 to 1989. During the 1990s, Guy joined St George Bank's marketing team as business development consultant, and then AMP's financial planning group, Hillross. With the assistance of the St George foundation, Guy was instrumental in the Murdoch Institute introducing a genetic educational course into Victorian schools.

Alongside these roles, he accommodated the many hundreds of reunion concerts with the Seekers from 1993 to about 2015, effectively curtailing any further political ambitions. In recent years, Guy has been involved in a joint venture with Hanging Rock Winery, launching "Athol's Paddock" in the Macedon Ranges. The first vintage from Athol's Paddock was 1997 and since that time has regularly produced award-winning shiraz.

His community roles have included:
 Inaugural member: Children's Protection Society
 Current patron: Kids Under Cover
 Current patron: Riding For the Disabled. 
 Current patron: Relay For Life. 
 Current patron: Tee Up for Kids. 
 Current patron: Sing Australia. 
 Current ambassador: Heart Kids – RCH. 
 Former chair: Daylesford Macedon Tourism Marketing
 Former chair: Tourism Macedon Ranges
 Former Macedon Memorial Cross trustee
 Current board: Living Legends
 Former Federal Ministers inaugural advisory board: Indigenous Tourism Australia

References

External links

Official website of the Seekers (archived)

The Seekers – groups and solo arts at the MILESAGO website
Australian TV History
Hanging Rock Winery
West Rock Farm review

The Seekers members
1940 births
Living people
Australian pop singers
Australian songwriters
Australian double-bassists
Members of the Victorian Legislative Assembly
Liberal Party of Australia members of the Parliament of Victoria
Male double-bassists
People educated at Melbourne High School
Australian expatriates in the United Kingdom
Officers of the Order of Australia
People from Colac, Victoria
Singers from Victoria (Australia)
21st-century double-bassists
20th-century Australian male singers
21st-century Australian male musicians
21st-century Australian musicians